Grafičar may refer to:
FK Grafičar Podgorica, Montenegrin football club in Podgorica
FK Grafičar Beograd, Serbian football club in Belgrade
NK Grafičar Vodovod, Croatian football club
NK Grafičar Ljubljana, Slovenian football club